PunkinHed EP is an extended play by Boondox. It is his first EP and his 2nd overall album. It features four new songs, and remixes of "They Pray with Snakes" and "Seven," from his first album, The Harvest. The EP peaked at #10 on the Billboard Top Heatseekers chart and #27 on the Top Independent Albums chart.

Track listing

Personnel

Vocals, Lyrics
 Boondox

Additional Vocals
 Violent J - (3)
 Carlito Hill - (7)
 Savannah Hill - (7)

Production
 Boondox - (1, 6)
 Seven - (2)
 Kuma - (3)
 Dr. Punch - (3, 6)
 Mike E. Clark - (4, 5)
 Tino Grosse - (4)

Charts

References

2007 EPs
Boondox EPs
Psychopathic Records EPs